National Action was a militant Australian white supremacist group founded in 1982 by Jim Saleam, a neo-Nazi activist and convicted criminal, and David Greason. Saleam had been a member of the short-lived National Socialist Party of Australia as a teenager during the 1970s.

Jim Saleam's criminal convictions include property offenses and fraud in 1984 and being an accessory before the fact in regard to organising a shotgun attack in 1989 on African National Congress representative Eddie Funde. Saleam served jail terms for both crimes. He pleaded not guilty to both charges, claiming that he was set up by police.

The group was disbanded following the murder of a member, Wayne "Bovver" Smith, in the group's headquarters at Tempe. Saleam later became the New South Wales chairman of the Australia First Party, and stood as its endorsed candidate several times.

The National Action co-founder David Greason's book, I was a Teenage Fascist, tells of Greason's own time within the Australian neo-Nazi movement and the events behind the founding of National Action.

See also 
 Australians Against Further Immigration
 Far-right politics in Australia
 Reclaim Australia
 True Blue Crew
 United Patriots Front

References

Far-right political parties in Australia
Neo-Nazi political parties
Neo-Nazism in Australia
Organisations based in Victoria (Australia)